Ermes Purro (born 17 June 1999) is an Italian professional footballer who plays as a defender.

Club career
Born in Massa, Purro was formed on Fiorentina youth system. He made his senior debut for Serie D club Lavagnese. On 11 July 2019 he joined to Serie C club Ravenna.

On 11 September 2020, Purro signed for Serie C club Lecco. His contract with Lecco was terminated by mutual consent on 21 December 2022.

References

External links
 
 

1999 births
Living people
People from Massa
Sportspeople from the Province of Massa-Carrara
Italian footballers
Association football defenders
Serie C players
Serie D players
ACF Fiorentina players
U.S.D. Lavagnese 1919 players
Ravenna F.C. players
Calcio Lecco 1912 players
Footballers from Tuscany